Botond Bognar is an American architect currently the Edgar A. Tafel Endowed Chair in Architecture at University of Illinois and also the Endowed Chair at University of Tokyo.

References

Year of birth missing (living people)
Living people
University of Illinois faculty
20th-century American architects
Budapest University alumni
University of California, Los Angeles alumni
Academic staff of the University of Tokyo
21st-century American architects